The North Carolina School of Science and Mathematics (NCSSM) is a two-year, public residential high school with two physical campuses located in Durham, North Carolina and Morganton, North Carolina that focuses on the intensive study of science, mathematics and technology. It accepts rising juniors from across North Carolina and enrolls them through senior year. Although NCSSM is a public school, enrollment is extremely selective, and applicants undergo a competitive review process for admission. NCSSM is a founding member of the National Consortium of Secondary Stem Schools (NCSSS) and a constituent institution of the University of North Carolina system. While not officially branded as such, many residents of North Carolina consider NCSSM to be a counterpart to the University of North Carolina School of the Arts due to their shared status as specialty residential high schools, with NCSSM focusing on science and math and the School of the Arts offering extended study in the arts.

History

Since its inception in 1980, NCSSM has been fully funded by the state, allowing students to attend without paying any tuition, room, board, or other student fees. This funding is supplemented by the NCSSM Foundation's private funding, which supports NCSSM's academic, residential, and outreach programs as well as providing funds for some capital improvements. In the past 25 years, the Foundation has raised in excess of $25 million in private support from corporations, foundations, alumni, parents and friends of NCSSM. A tuition fee was considered for the 2002–03 school year in the midst of a state budgetary crisis, but it was never implemented. In 2003, the NC Legislature approved a bill granting tuition costs for any university in the University of North Carolina System to all graduates of NCSSM, starting with the class of 2004, as an incentive to encourage NCSSM's talented students to stay in North Carolina. That bill was amended in 2005 to allow students to use additional tuition monies awarded to cover "costs of attendance." However, the tuition waiver was phased out in the Appropriations Act of 2009 in the North Carolina Senate in order to balance the budget. The bill states that "No new recipients shall be funded after June 30, 2009."
The tuition grant was renewed retroactive for 2021 graduates in November 2021 in the Current Appropriations Act of 2021. 

NCSSM served as a model for 18 similar schools, many of which are now members of the National Consortium of Secondary STEM Schools (NCSSS).

NCSSM has opened a second campus in Morganton, North Carolina opening for the 2022-23 school year. This campus houses approximately 300 students.

Academics

NCSSM students are not given a class rank and are encouraged to strive for their best rather than competing against other students. Although students previously were not given grade point averages (GPAs), the school has since changed their ways to provide GPAs on transcripts and simplify the college application process. 

The school has done well in the national rankings for many years, including being listed as the 4th best public high school in the United States and the second best in North Carolina by Newsweek and being listed among The Washington Post's 2014 "top-performing schools with elite students.". In 2022, Niche deemed NCSSM the best public high school in the United States. Teachers at NCSSM have also won awards, with music instructor Phillip Riggs winning the Grammy Music Educator Award in 2016.

Demographics
During the 2013–2014 school year, NCSSM housed approximately 680 students. There were 346 seniors enrolled in the class of 2013. Currently, there are more females than males due to the larger number of female dormitory spaces. Approximately 56% of students are Caucasian, 26.6% are Asian American, 8.1% are African American, 5.5% are Hispanic, and 0.3% are Native American.  The student population of NCSSM is designed to be a demographic reflection of the population of North Carolina as a whole; additionally, a certain number of slots are reserved for each congressional district.

Academic achievement
In 2018 the average SAT score was 1439 of 1600, the second highest in North Carolina. In 2019 it was also second highest in NC, with 1437 of 1600.

External programs
NCSSM also offers a variety of external programs focused on educating teachers and students outside of the school across North Carolina. The school offers workshops for strengthening K–12 math and science education, focusing on "teaching the teacher." These workshops focus particularly in science and mathematics education.

Extracurricular activities
NCSSM has a large variety of clubs and varsity sports, ranging from arts, academic, and ethnic culture clubs to intramural and varsity athletic programs. Students at NCSSM regularly excel in club competitions, academic events, and sports.

Awards and recognition
The school is known to place upwards of ten students a year in the Siemens Competition in Math, Science, and Technology. In 2006, Nicholas Tang and Sagar Indurkhya became national finalists in that year's Siemens Competition. NCSSM also regularly produces semifinalists in the Intel Science Talent Search and Intel Science and Engineering Fair.

In 2008, the NCSSM team won first place in the WorldQuest geography competition at the national level.

In 2010, NCSSM won first place at the 2010 National DOE Science Bowl Competition, and the students on the team met Michelle Obama.

In 2015, the NCSSM Robotics Team, FIRST Robotics Team 900, The Zebracorns, came in 3rd place at the FIRST World Championship in Saint Louis.

In 2019, Navami Jain was selected as a finalist in the Regeneron Science Talent Search competition

Athletics
The North Carolina School of Science and Mathematics offers 21 varsity sports to its students, including baseball, volleyball, basketball, and wrestling.

Visit: https://www.gounis.com/about/athletics
 
In 2011, for the first time in this school's history, all of the NCSSM varsity sports in the fall season won regional championships. Men's cross-country and men's soccer were state champions, while women's tennis and women's volleyball were state runners-up and a member of the women's diving team placed second at the 1A/2A state meet. The NCSSM men's cross-country team has won three straight state championships.

In the 2018–2019 season, NCSSM teams received nine Mid-State 2A conference titles. The school's athletes were awarded 98 All-Conference titles in the 2018–2019 season, at least one in every sport offered by the school.

Robotics
NCSSM has a FIRST Robotics Competition team, Team 900, The Zebracorns. Awards won by this team include

2014 North Carolina Regional Winners
2015 North Carolina Regional Winners
2015 FIRST Championship Curie Division Winners
2017 North Carolina District – Raleigh Event District Chairman's Award
2017 FIRST North Carolina State Championship Winners
2018 North Carolina District – Forsyth County Event District Chairman's Award

They also presented at ROSCon 2018 in Madrid, Spain.

Notable alumni
 Adam Falk '83, President of Williams College
 Helen Moore '84, mathematician
 Maya Ajmera '85, Founder and President of The Global Fund for Children
 Katharine Stewart '85, medical psychologist and Provost at North Carolina State University
 Joe Britt '87, Co-founder of Danger Inc. makers of the Sidekick, an early smartphone
 Erica D. Smith '88, member of the North Carolina Senate
 Daniel P. Aldrich '92, academic in the fields of political science, public policy, and Asian studies
 Matt Welsh '92, former Gordon McKay Professor of Computer Science at Harvard University and author of several books
 Ralph Hise '94, member of North Carolina Senate
 Steven Schkolne '94, computer scientist and inventor of speedcabling
 Rhiannon Giddens '95, member of the Grammy-winning Carolina Chocolate Drops
 Scott Jacobson '95, comedy writer (Bob's Burgers) and four-time Emmy winner
 Christina Hammock Koch '97, NASA astronaut and Flight Engineer on ISS Expeditions 59, 60, and 61
 B. Scott  '99, Internet Celebrity, TV personality and blogger
 Chris Hardwick '02, competitive speedcuber
 Janneke Parrish '09, Labor activist and AppleToo leader

See also

 Alabama School of Mathematics and Science
 Arkansas School for Mathematics, Sciences, and the Arts
 Carol Martin Gatton Academy of Mathematics and Science in Kentucky
 Craft Academy for Excellence in Science and Mathematics
 Illinois Mathematics and Science Academy
 Indiana Academy for Science, Mathematics, and Humanities
 Kansas Academy of Mathematics and Science
 Louisiana School for Math, Science, and the Arts
 Maine School of Science and Mathematics 
 Mississippi School for Mathematics and Science
 Oklahoma School of Science and Mathematics
 South Carolina Governor's School for Science and Mathematics
 Texas Academy of Mathematics and Science

References

External links
 

Boarding schools in North Carolina
Gifted education
Public high schools in North Carolina
NCSSS schools
Educational institutions established in 1980
Schools in Durham County, North Carolina
University of North Carolina
1980 establishments in North Carolina
Public boarding schools in the United States